Gijs van Beek (born July 21, 1971 in Rhenen) is a Dutch sport shooter. He competed at the 2000 Summer Olympics in the men's skeet event, in which he tied for 12th place.

References

1971 births
Living people
Skeet shooters
Dutch male sport shooters
Shooters at the 2000 Summer Olympics
Olympic shooters of the Netherlands